The Oxford City Stars are an ice hockey team based in Oxford, England. They currently play in the NIHL South Division 1.

Club roster 2022-23
(*) Denotes a Non-British Trained player (Import)

2021/22 Outgoing

Honours 
 British Division 2 (South) Champions – 1984/85, 1990/91, 1995/96
 British Division 2 Playoff Champions – 1984/85
 National Ice Hockey League, Division 2 (South) Champions – 2012/13, 2017-18
 English National League Runners-up – 2003/04, 2004/05 
 English National League Cup Runners-up – 2003/04

Season-by-season record

'*Stars folded midway through the campaign and all of their results were expunged.

'# Oxford Chill were forced to relocate to Swindon just prior to the start of the league campaign due to a major ice plant failure at the rink. After this happened, they were renamed the Swindon Chill.

Season-by-season record (reserve teams)
Over the seasons the Stars have periodically iced teams in division as a reserve teams and a season by season list is below:

Other associated teams 

The Oxford City ice hockey club also has junior and women's teams as follows:-

Under 9s (English League South)
Under 11s (English League South Division 3)
Under 13s (English League South Division 3)
Under 15s (English League South Division 3)
Under 18s (English League South Division 3)
Under 20s 
Oxford Midnight Stars (Women's League Division 1 South)

References

External links 
 
English Ice Hockey Association website
 Oxford Ice Rink webpages

Ice hockey clubs established in 1984
Ice hockey teams in England
Sport in Oxford
Organisations based in Oxford
1984 establishments in England